P80 is a solid-fuel first-stage rocket motor used on the European Space Agency Vega rocket (in the P80FW version). It is the world's largest and most powerful one-piece solid-fuel rocket engine.

History 
The P80's development was led by a joint team of ESA, CNES and ASI since 2005, with Avio selected as the prime contractor. The first test of the P80 engine was completed at Centre Spatial Guyanais in November 2006 followed by qualification tests in December 2007. The first launch was completed on 13 February 2012, with the first commercial launch following on 7 May 2012. Total development cost of the engine reached €76 million.

Overview 
P80FW is a single monolithic solid rocket motor propelled by hydroxyl-terminated polybutadiene which burns for 114 seconds and is jettisoned at an altitude of 53 km after achieving a relative speed of 1.7 km/s.

The engine shares specifications with Ariane 5 solid rocket boosters - it has the same 3 meter diameter and similar height to the largest segments of the booster. This allows using the same facilities and equipment at the Guiana Propellant Plant for loading the propellant and transporting the engine to the launch site. The nozzle of the P80 is also a direct evolution of the one used in Ariane 5 boosters.

The manufacture process is divided among several European companies. Italian Avio manufactures the main motor case loaded with fuel, performs integration of the components, and final testing. French-Italian Europropulsion manufactures the P80 motor while Regulus performs propellant loading. Aerospace Propulsion Products B.V. from Netherlands builds the igniter. Belgian SABCA produces components for thrust vectoring and the staging skirt. French Herakles manufactures the engine nozzle.

Related development

P120C 
The P120C a wider version of the engine with increased propellant mass to 143.6 tons, is in development for use as Ariane 6 boosters and Vega C first stage. In 2022, an extended P120C+ version was proposed.

See also

 P120 (rocket stage)
 Zefiro (rocket stage)
 Solid rocket
 Vega (rocket)

References

Rocket stages
Solid-fuel rockets